Baimbetovo (Bayımbet, Qunaqbay) is a rural locality (a village) in Burlinsky Selsoviet, Gafuriysky District, Bashkortostan, Russia. The population was 175 in 2010.

History 
The village was founded in the 17th century by Baimbet Ichigulov.

It was known by two names: Baimbetovo and Kunakbai.

Earlier in 1896, the village was located near the Burlinka River.

At the end of the 19th century a water mill operated there.

Geography 
It is located 139 km from Ufa (the capital of Bashkortostan), 36 km north of Krasnousolsky (rural locality) and 6 km from Burly.

References 

Rural localities in Gafuriysky District